Janardan Paswan is an Indian politician and two-time elected member from Chatra Vidhan Sabha constituency to Bihar and Jharkhand assembly. First he was elected in year 1995 on the ticket of Janta Dal for Bihar legislative assembly. After the partition of state of Bihar into two states Bihar and Jharkhand on 14 November 2000, BJP won the Chatra seat twice. Then again in year 2009 assembly election Janardan Paswan got the mandate of people of Chatra on the ticket of RJD, and served his second tenure as MLA in Jharkhand legislative assembly.

He was born in the Partapur village and completed his schooling from Partapur school. He is a graduate in Sanskrit from KS Sanskrit University, Darbhanga.

He was a prominent face of Rashtriya Janata Dal in Jharkhand state and best known for his good and close relation with RJD supremo Lalu Prasad Yadav.

Before 2019 Jharkhand assembly election he left RJD and joined BJP. He contested 2019 assembly election from Chatra Vishan Sabha seat on the ticket of Bharatiya Janata Party.

References

Living people
Bharatiya Janata Party politicians from Jharkhand
Bihar MLAs 1995–2000
Jharkhand MLAs 2009–2014
Year of birth missing (living people)
People from Chatra district
Jharkhand politicians by Rashtriya Janata Dal